The Sony Cyber-shot DSC-RX10 II is a DSLR-styled digital bridge camera announced by Sony on June 10, 2015. Its main improvement over its predecessor, the 2013 Sony Cyber-shot DSC-RX10, is its 2160p 4K video recording ability, as well as added high-framerate with 1080p doubled to 120fps (real-time and retained audio), and high speed video at 240fps, 480fps, and 960fps.

While filming at up to 1080p and up to 60fps, 17-Megapixel still images can be captured. The "dual video recording" mode allows recording into two separate files with different resolution, where one is more "lightweight"  than the other.

Notes

References

http://www.dpreview.com/products/sony/compacts/sony_dscrx10ii/specifications

RX10 II
Cameras introduced in 2015